Šverko is a Serbo-Croatian surname. Notable people with the surname include:

Marin Šverko (born 1998), Croatian footballer
Radojka Šverko (born 1948), Croatian singer-songwriter

Croatian surnames
Slavic-language surnames